Propefusus is a genus of sea snails, marine gastropod mollusks in the subfamily Fusininae of the family Fasciolariidae, the spindle snails, the tulip snails and their allies.

Species
Species within the genus Propefusus include:
 Propefusus australis (Quoy & Gaimard, 1833)
 Propefusus novaehollandiae (Reeve, 1848)
 Propefusus undulatus (Perry, 1811)

References

 Vermeij G.J. & Snyder M.A. (2018). Proposed genus-level classification of large species of Fusininae (Gastropoda, Fasciolariidae). Basteria. 82(4-6): 57-82

External links
 Iredale, T. (1924). Results from Roy Bell's molluscan collections. Proceedings of the Linnean Society of New South Wales. 49: 179-278

Gastropod genera